Wibert of Littleton was the Dean of Wells during 1334.

References

Deans of Wells